The 1983 Horsham District Council election took place on 5 May 1983 to elect members of Horsham District Council in England. It was held on the same day as other local elections. The Conservatives retained control of the council with 35 seats, a majority of 14, Independent candidates won 5 seats and the SDP–Liberal Alliance won 2.

Council Composition 

Prior to the election, the composition of the council was:

After the election, the composition of the council was:

Results summary

Ward results

Billingshurst

Bramber & Upper Beeding

Broadbridge Heath

Chanctonbury

Cowfold

Denne

Forest

Henfield

Jones K. was elected in Henfield as a Residents' association member in 1979, when this seat was last contested. The change of his vote share has been included.

Itchingfield & Shipley

Nuthurst

Pulborough & Coldwatham

Riverside

Roffey

Rudgwick

Rusper

Slinfold

Southwater

Steyning

Storrington

Sullington

Trafalgar

Warnham

West Chiltington

West Grinstead

References

1983 English local elections
May 1983 events in the United Kingdom
1983
1980s in West Sussex